Jeff Steinborn (born 1970), is a Democratic member of the New Mexico State Senate, serving since 2017.

Steinborn previously served in the New Mexico House of Representatives from 2006–10 and from 2013–17. Steinborn took office as Representative for the second time after defeating incumbent Antonio Lujan in the Democratic primary in June, 2012. In 2016 Steinborn defeated Republican Incumbent Senator Lee Cotter to become the State Senator for District 36, and was re-elected in 2020.

Steinborn has worked as an aide to former Governor Bill Richardson, a field representative for former Senator Jeff Bingaman, and was chairman of the Democratic Party of Doña Ana County. He is Executive Director of Outdoor New Mexico. In 2015 Steinborn co-founded Film Las Cruces, where he serves as Board President. The organization is credited with significantly increasing film production in Las Cruces and Dona Ana County.

As a legislator he has passed diverse legislation including establishing the Rio Grande Trail and the New Mexico Outdoor Recreation Division, increased legislative and lobbying transparency, advanced clean up of abandoned uranium mine sites, increased youth participation in government, and created a new rural film incentive. In his professional conservation capacity he led the campaign to establish the Organ Mountains-Desert Peaks National Monument.

Family
Jeff Steinborn was born in Las Cruces, New Mexico. He has three sisters and two brothers, including his identical twin brother Daniel Steinborn.

References

External links
 
 Legislative page

1970 births
Living people
Politicians from Las Cruces, New Mexico
21st-century American politicians
Democratic Party New Mexico state senators